Gul Imam railway station 
() is  located in  Pakistan.  It is located at the longitude of 70.511825 and latitude of 32.258485.

See also
 List of railway stations in Pakistan
 Pakistan Railways

References

External links

Railway stations in Tank District